Balacra daphaena is a moth of the family Erebidae. It was described by George Hampson in 1898. It is found in Angola, Cameroon, the Republic of the Congo, the Democratic Republic of the Congo, Niger and Nigeria.

References

Moths described in 1898
Erebid moths of Africa
Syntomini